SM U-23 or U-XXIII was a  or U-boat built for and operated by the Austro-Hungarian Navy ( or ) during the First World War. The design for U-23 was based on that of the submarines of the Royal Danish Navy's Havmanden class (which had been designed by Whitehead & Co. in Fiume), and was largely obsolete by the beginning of the war.

In February 1918, U-23 was sunk with all hands by the Italian torpedo boat Airone while attempting an attack on the Italian transport . U-23 had no wartime successes.

Design and construction 
When it became apparent to the Austro-Hungarian Navy that the First World War would not be a short one, they moved to bolster their U-boat fleet by seizing the plans for the Danish Havmanden class submarines, which had been designed by Whitehead & Co. in Fiume, who had built three units. Although the Austro-Hungarian Navy was not happy with the design, which was largely obsolete, it was the only design for which plans were available and which could be begun immediately in domestic shipyards. The Austro-Hungarian Navy unenthusiastically placed orders for U-23 and her three sister boats on 27 March 1915.

U-23 was one of two boats of the class to be built at the Hungarian UBAG yard in Fiume. Due to demands by the Hungarian government, subcontracts for the class were divided between Hungarian and Austrian firms, and this politically expedient solution worsened technical problems with the design, resulting in numerous modifications and delays for the class in general.

U-23 was an ocean-going submarine that displaced  surfaced and  submerged and was designed for a complement of 18. For propulsion, she featured a single shaft, a single  diesel engine for surface running, and a single  electric motor for submerged travel. She was capable of  while surfaced and  while submerged.

U-23 was armed with two  torpedo tubes located in the front and carried a complement of two torpedoes. She was also equipped with a /26 deck gun and an  machine gun.

Service career 
U-23 was launched on 5 January 1917, but It is not known with certainty when U-23 was commissioned. Author Paul Halpern reports that U-23 and her three sisters all entered service between August and November 1917. Although there are no specific reports of problems with U-23, the U-20 class as a whole suffered from unreliable engines which compounded the poor handling characteristics of the boats.
On 21 February 1918, Linienschiffsleutnant Klemens Ritter von Bezard, U-23s only commanding officer, was guiding the boat in an attack on the Italian transport  in the Straits of Otranto. U-23 came under attack by the Italian torpedo boat Airone which first tried to ram the U-boat, and then deployed an explosive paravane. When the paravane contacted the submerged U-23, it exploded, blowing debris into the air and sinking the submarine with all hands. Like all of her sister boats, U-23 had no wartime successes.

References

Bibliography 

 
 
 
 

1917 ships
Maritime incidents in 1918
U-20-class submarines
U-boats commissioned in 1917
U-boats sunk in 1918
U-boats sunk by Italian warships
Ships built in Fiume
Ships lost with all hands
World War I shipwrecks in the Adriatic Sea
World War I submarines of Austria-Hungary